Purex may refer to:

 PUREX (plutonium uranium reduction extraction), a reprocessing process for spent nuclear fuel
 Purex (laundry detergent), a brand of detergent
 Purex Crystals, a laundry fragrance booster
 Toilet tissue brand by Kruger Inc.